The JDRF/Wellcome Trust Diabetes and Inflammation Laboratory (JDRF/WT DIL), centred in the Cambridge Institute for Medical Research, is a multi-disciplinary research programme within the department of Medical Genetics at the University of Cambridge. The current director is John Todd FMedSci  FRS and Professor of Medical Genetics at the University of Cambridge.

The goals of the JDRF/WT DIL are to identify and characterise the effects of the susceptibility genes for type 1 diabetes in order to better understand the earliest events in human physiology that lead to autoimmune destruction of the insulin-producing beta-cells of pancreas.

Other notable members include:-
 Linda Wicker, Professor of Immunogenetics (Co-Director)
 David Clayton, Professor of Biostatistics

External links
 Cambridge Institute for Medical Research (CIMR)
 JDRF/WT DIL Homepage
 Current list of Human Type 1 Diabetes susceptibility regions

References

Diabetes organizations